Jyamire may refer to several places in Nepal:

Jyamire, Sindhupalchok
Jyamire, Khotang
Jyamire, Palpa
Jyamire, Okhaldhunga